Nicolaas Thomas Bernhard (9 February 1931 – 12 February 1989) was an Austrian novelist, playwright and poet who explored death, social injustice, and human misery in controversial literature that was deeply pessimistic about modern civilization in general and Austrian culture in particular. Bernhard's body of work has been called "the most significant literary achievement since World War II." He is widely considered to be one of the most important German-language authors of the postwar era.

Life 
Thomas Bernhard was born in 1931 in Heerlen in the Netherlands, where his unmarried mother Herta Bernhard worked as a maid. From the autumn of 1931 he lived with his grandparents in Vienna until 1937 when his mother, who had married in the meantime, moved him to Traunstein, Bavaria, in Nazi Germany. There he was required to join the Deutsches Jungvolk, a branch of the Hitler Youth, which he hated. Bernhard's natural father Alois Zuckerstätter was a carpenter and petty criminal who refused to acknowledge his son. Zuckerstätter died in Berlin from gas poisoning in an assumed suicide in 1940; Bernhard never met him.

Bernhard's grandfather, the author , pushed for an artistic education for him, including musical instruction. Bernhard went to elementary school in Seekirchen and later attended various schools in Salzburg including the Johanneum which he left in 1947 to start an apprenticeship with a grocer. George Steiner describes Bernhard's schooling as "hideous... under a sadistically repressive system, run first by Catholic priests, then by Nazis".

Bernhard's Lebensmensch (a predominantly Austrian term, which was coined by Bernhard himself and which refers to the most important person in one's life) was Hedwig Stavianicek (1894–1984), a woman more than thirty-seven years his senior, whom he cared for alone in her dying days. He had met Stavianicek in 1950, the year of his mother's death and one year after the death of his beloved grandfather. Stavianicek was the major support in Bernhard's life and greatly furthered his literary career. The extent or nature of his relationships with women is obscure. Thomas Bernhard's public persona was asexual.
Suffering throughout his teens from lung ailments, including tuberculosis, Bernhard spent the years 1949 to 1951 at the Grafenhof sanatorium  in Sankt Veit im Pongau. He trained as an actor at the Mozarteum in Salzburg (1955–1957) and was always profoundly interested in music. His lung condition, however, made a career as a singer impossible. After that he worked briefly as a journalist, mainly as a crime reporter, and then became a full-time writer.  In 1970, he won the Georg Büchner Prize.

In 1978, Bernhard was diagnosed with sarcoidosis. After a decade of needing constant medical care for his lungs, he died in 1989 in Gmunden, Upper Austria. Although there have been claims that he died by assisted suicide, contemporaneous obituaries reported, and Bernhard's half-brother, Dr. Peter Fabjan, confirmed that Bernhard had a heart attack. His death was announced only after his funeral.  In his will, which aroused great controversy on publication, Bernhard prohibited any new stagings of his plays and publication of his unpublished work in Austria; however, in 1999 this was annulled by his heir, Peter Fabjan. Bernhard's attractive house in Ohlsdorf-Obernathal 2 where he had moved in 1965 is now a museum and centre for the study and performance of his work.

Work 
Often criticized in Austria as a Nestbeschmutzer (one who dirties his own nest) for his critical views, Bernhard was highly acclaimed abroad. Nevertheless, while reviled by some Austrians for his outspoken and harsh views of his homeland, including its Nazi past,  he was, during his lifetime, also highly acclaimed in Austria, winning major awards, and was seen by many as the preeminent writer of the time.

His work is most influenced by the feeling of being abandoned (in his childhood and youth) and by his incurable illness, which caused him to see death as the ultimate essence of existence. His work typically features loners' monologues explaining, to a rather silent listener, their views on the state of the world, often with reference to a concrete situation and sometimes reported secondhand by the listener. Alongside his serious and pessimistic views, his works also contain funny observations on life. Bernhard is often considered a verbose writer, but Andreas Dorschel has broadened this view by showing that Bernhard's characters (specifically in Das Kalkwerk) oscillate between excessive speech and highly economical expressions. As Dorschel argues, the two modes produce a series of oppositions with mutually informing sides.

Bernhard's main protagonists, often scholars or, as he calls them, Geistesmenschen (intellectuals), denounce everything that matters to the Austrian in contumacy-filled tirades against a "stupid populace". He also attacks the state (often called "Catholic-National-Socialist"), generally respected institutions such as Vienna's Burgtheater, and much-loved artists. His work also deals with the isolation and self-destruction of people striving for an unreachable perfection, since this same perfection would mean stagnancy and therefore death. Anti-Catholic rhetoric is not uncommon.

"Es ist alles lächerlich, wenn man an den Tod denkt" (It's all ridiculous, when one thinks of death) was his comment when he received a minor Austrian national award in 1968, which resulted in one of the many public scandals he caused over the years and which became part of his fame. His novel Holzfällen (1984), for instance, could not be published for years because of a defamation claim by a former friend. Many of his plays—above all Heldenplatz (1988)—were met with criticism from many Austrians, who claimed they sullied Austria's reputation. One of the more controversial lines referred to Austria as "a brutal and stupid nation ... a mindless, cultureless sewer which spreads its penetrating stench all over Europe." Heldenplatz, as well as the other plays Bernhard wrote in these years, were staged at Vienna's famous Burgtheater by the controversial director .

Even in death Bernhard caused disturbance by his posthumous literary emigration, as he supposedly called it, by which his will disallowed all publication and stagings of his work within Austria. The International Thomas Bernhard Foundation, established by his executor and half-brother Dr. Peter Fabjan, has since made exceptions, although the German firm of Suhrkamp remains his principal publisher.

The correspondence between Bernhard and his publisher Siegfried Unseld from 1961 to 1989 – about 500 letters – was published in December 2009 at Suhrkamp Verlag, Germany.

Bibliography

Novels 
 Frost (1963). Translated by Michael Hofmann (2006).
Verstörung (1967). Gargoyles, translated by Richard and Clara Winston (1970).
Das Kalkwerk (1970). The Lime Works, translated by Sophie Wilkins (1973).
Korrektur (1975). Correction, translated by Sophie Wilkins (1979).
Ja (1978). Yes, translated by Ewald Osers (1991).
Die Billigesser (1980). The Cheap-Eaters, translated by Ewald Osers (1990) and Douglas Robertson (2021).
Beton (1982), Concrete, translated by David McLintock (1984).
Wittgensteins Neffe. Eine Freundschaft (1982). Wittgenstein's Nephew, translated by Ewald Osers (1986) and David McLintock (1989).
Der Untergeher (1983). The Loser, translated by Jack Dawson (1991).
Holzfällen. Eine Erregung (1984). Translated by David McLintock as Woodcutters (1987) and Ewald Osers as Cutting Timber: An Irritation (1988).
Alte Meister. Komödie (1985). Old Masters: A Comedy, translated by Ewald Osers (1989).
Auslöschung. Ein Zerfall (1986). Extinction, translated by David McLintock (1995).
In der Höhe. Rettungsversuch, Unsinn (written 1959, published 1989). On the Mountain, translated by Russell Stockman (1991).

Novellas and short story collections 
Amras (1964).
Watten. Ein Nachlaß (1964). Playing Watten.
Prosa (1967). Prose, translated by Martin Chalmers (Seagull Books, 2010). Includes seven stories.
Gehen (1971). Walking.
Midland in Stilfs (1971). Includes three stories: "Midland in Stilfs", "Der Wetterfleck", and "Am Ortler".
 (1978). The Voice Imitator: 104 Stories, translated by Kenneth J. Northcott (1997).
Goethe schtirbt (2010). Goethe Dies, translated by James Reidel (Seagull Books, 2016). Includes four stories from the early 1980s.

Plays 
Ein Fest für Boris (1968). A Party for Boris.
Die Jagdgesellschaft (1974). The Hunting Party, translated by Gita Honegger (1980).
Die Macht der Gewohnheit. Komödie (1974). The Force of Habit: A Comedy, translated by Neville and Stephen Plaice (1976).
Der Präsident (1975). The President.
Minetti. Ein Portrait des Künstlers als alter Mann (1977). Minetti, translated by Gita Honegger (2000) as well as Tom Cairns and Peter Eyre (2014).
  (1978). First performed on 15 April 1978, directed by Claus Peymann at the Staatstheater Stuttgart.
Der Weltverbesserer (1979). The World-Fixer, translated by Josef Glowa, Donald McManus and Susan Hurly-Glowa (2005).
Vor dem Ruhestand. Eine Komödie von deutscher Seele (1979). Eve of Retirement.
Über allen Gipfeln ist Ruh (1981). Over All the Mountain Tops, translated by Michael Mitchell (2004).
Am Ziel (1981). Destination, translated by Jan-Willem van den Bosch (2001).
Der deutsche Mittagstisch (1981). The German Lunch Table, translated by Gita Honegger (1981).
Der Schein trügt (1983). Appearances Are Deceiving, translated by Gita Honegger (1983).
Der Theatermacher (1984). Histrionics.
Ritter, Dene, Voss (1984).
Einfach kompliziert (1986). Simply Complicated.
Elisabeth II (1987). Elizabeth II, translated by Meredith Oakes (1992).
Heldenplatz (1988). Translated by Gita Honegger (1999) as well as Andrea Tierney and Meredith Oakes (2010).
Claus Peymann kauft sich eine Hose und geht mit mir essen (1990). Claus Peymann Buys Himself a Pair of Pants and Joins Me for Lunch, translated by Damion Searls (1990).

Miscellaneous 
Auf der Erde und in der Hölle (1957). On Earth and in Hell: Early Poems, translated by Peter Waugh (Three Rooms Press, 2015).
Viktor Halbnarr. Ein Wintermärchen nicht nur für Kinder (1966). Victor Halfwit: A Winter's Tale, translated by Martin Chalmers (Seagull Books, 2011).
Meine Preise (2009). My Prizes: An Accounting, translated by Carol Brown Janeway (2010).

Compilations in English 

 The President and Eve of Retirement (1982). Collects The President and Eve of Retirement; translated by Gitta Honegger.
Gathering Evidence (1985, memoir). Collects Die Ursache (1975), Der Keller (1976), Der Atem (1978), Die Kälte (1981) and Ein Kind (1982); translated by David McLintock.
 Histrionics: Three Plays (1990). Collects A Party for Boris; Ritter, Dene, Voss; and Histrionics; translated by Peter Jansen and Kenneth Northcott.
 Three Novellas (2003). Collects Amras, Playing Watten and Walking; translated by Peter Jansen and Kenneth J. Northcott.
In Hora Mortis / Under the Iron of the Moon (2006, poetry). Collects In Hora Mortis (1958) and Unter dem Eisen des Mondes (1958); translated by James Reidel.
Collected Poems (2017). Translated by James Reidel.
The Rest Is Slander: Five Stories (2022). Collects "Ungenach" (1968), "The Weatherproof Cape" ("Der Wetterfleck", 1971), "Midland in Stilfs" (1971), "At the Ortler" ("Am Ortler", 1971), and "At the Timberline" ("An der Baumgrenze", 1969); translated by Douglas Robertson.

References

Sources 
 Website dedicated to Thomas Bernhard: works, essays, reviews
 List of works from the German Wikipedia entry
 Thomas Bernhard's Heldenplatz in the press (German)
 Links to various related resources
 Random Evidence on Thomas Bernhard

Further reading 
 Theo Breuer, Die Arbeit als Leidenschaft, die fortgesetzte Partitur als Leben. Hommage zum 80. Geburtstag.
 Samuel Frederick, Narratives Unsettled: Digression in Robert Walser, Thomas Bernhard, and Adalbert Stifter. Evanston, Ill: Northwestern University Press, 2012.
 Gitta Honegger, Thomas Bernhard: The Making of an Austrian, New Haven, CT: Yale University Press, 2001, .
 Kay Link, Die Welt als Theater. Künstlichkeit und Künstlertum bei Thomas Bernhard. Akademischer Verlag Stuttgart, Stuttgart 2000, .
 Jonathan J. Long, The Novels of Thomas Bernhard: Form and its Function, Rochester, NY: Camden House Inc., 2001, .
 Thomas Bernhard: 3 Days, From the film by Ferry Radax, Blast Books, 2016, .
Fatima Naqvi, How We Learn Where We Live: Thomas Bernhard, Architecture, and Bildung, Northwestern University Press, Evanston, Illinois, 2015.
Augustinus P. Dierick: "The Teller from the Tale: Monologues, Dialogues, and Protocols in Thomas Bernhard's Major Novels."                              Oxford German Studies, 44.4 (2015), 1-12.  ,

Reviews
 Baskin, Jason M., "Thomas Bernhard," Boston Review, Summer 2002). Review of Gitta Honegger's biography and three books by Bernhard.
 Craft, Robert, "The Comedian of Horror," The New York Review of Books, Sept. 27, 1990. Review of ten books by Bernhard.
  Review of Concrete.

Films 
 Ferry Radax: Thomas Bernhard – Drei Tage (Thomas Bernhard – three days, 1970). Directed by Ferry Radax and based on a written self-portrait by Thomas Bernhard.
 Ferry Radax: Der Italiener (The Italian, 1972), a feature film directed by Ferry Radax and based on a script by Thomas Bernhard.

External links 

  
  
 
 Five stories from The Voice Imitator.
 Shooting of "Monologe auf Mallorca" Pictures by Stephan Mussil
 Salon.com review by Ben Marcus of The Voice Imitator
 Bernhardiana, a critical anthology on/of Thomas Bernhard (English/Italian)
 Thomas Bernhard for life, 1986 interview with Thomas Bernhard
 An essay on Wittgenstein's Nephew by Ben Lerner in The Times Literary Supplement, September 20, 2019
 "The Genius of Bad News", Tim Parks, The New York Review of Books, January 11, 2007
 "The Darkest Comedian," Adam Kirsch, The New York Review of Books, February 10, 2011
Sound recordings  with Thomas Bernhard in the Online Archive of the Österreichische Mediathek (Literary readings, interviews and radio reports) 

1931 births
1989 deaths
People from Heerlen
20th-century Austrian novelists
Austrian male novelists
Austrian male dramatists and playwrights
Austrian expatriates in the Netherlands
Austrian people of Dutch descent
Anton Wildgans Prize winners
Prix Médicis étranger winners
Georg Büchner Prize winners
Members of the German Academy for Language and Literature
20th-century Austrian dramatists and playwrights
German-language poets
Austrian male poets
20th-century Austrian male writers
Philosophical pessimists
Hitler Youth members